A spermatocelectomy is a surgical procedure performed to remove a spermatocele by separating it from the epididymis. The patient is given an anesthetic in the groin and a small incision is made into the scrotum.  The surgeon pulls the testicle and epididymis to the incision and separates the spermatocele by tying it off with a suture. The surgeon then removes it, and stitches up the area.

References

Male genital surgery